The 2004 Advanta Championships was a tennis tournament played on indoor hard courts at The Pavilion in Villanova, Philadelphia, Pennsylvania in the United States that was part of Tier II of the 2004 WTA Tour. It was the 20th edition of the tournament and was held from November 1 through November 7, 2004. First-seeded Amélie Mauresmo won her second consecutive singles title and earned $93,000 first-prize money.

Finals

Singles
 Amélie Mauresmo defeated  Vera Zvonareva 3–6, 6–2, 6–2
 It was Mauresmo's 5th singles title of the year and the 15th of her career.

Doubles
 Alicia Molik /  Lisa Raymond defeated  Liezel Huber /  Corina Morariu 7–5, 6–4

References

External links
 ITF tournament edition details
 Tournament draws

Advanta Championships of Philadelphia
Advanta Championships of Philadelphia
Advanta Championships
Advanta Championships
Advanta Championships